The Ameline swiftlet (Aerodramus amelis), also known as the grey swiftlet, was formerly considered as a subspecies of the uniform swiftlet. It is endemic to the Philippines.  Its natural habitat is subtropical or tropical moist lowland forests. Despite some fears around conservation, the species remains a Least-concern species.

Two subspecies are recognised:
 A. a. amelis (Oberholser, 1906) – Philippines (except Palawan group)
 A. a. palawanensis (Stresemann, 1914) – Palawan group and Balambangan Island (north of northeast Borneo)

References

Ameline swiftlet
Endemic birds of the Philippines
Ameline swiftlet
Taxa named by Harry C. Oberholser
Taxonomy articles created by Polbot